Callitris preissii is a species of conifer in the family Cupressaceae, endemic to Rottnest Island, Australia. Common names include Rottnest Island pine, Murray pine, maroong, southern cypress pine, or slender cypress pine. The Noongar peoples know the tree as marro.

Description
It is relatively slow growing. The crown is commonly made up fine, dense foliage. It starts producing brown-yellow-orange cones between October and January. The root system is generally moderate to deep or shallow and spreading. It is reasonably long lived, usually to over 15 years of age.

Distribution
It is endemic to the Swan Coastal Plain, Rottnest Island and Garden Island but has become naturalised elsewhere and now has a scattered distribution throughout the Mid West, Wheatbelt, Peel, Great Southern and Goldfields-Esperance regions where it is found on plains, slopes, the margins of salt lakes and among granite outcrops growing in sandy, loamy or clay soils.

Uses
The plant makes a good windbreak or as a shelterbelt or shade for stock. The trunks make ideal fence posts and it has good ornamental attributes. The plant's pollen has value for apiculture. In urban areas it makes a good ornamental plant, or as a free street tree and is suitable as a screen or hedge.

References

preissii
Trees of Australia
Pinales of Australia
Least concern flora of Australia
Flora of Western Australia
Flora of South Australia
Flora of New South Wales
Flora of Victoria (Australia)
Rottnest Island
Trees of Mediterranean climate
Drought-tolerant trees
Taxonomy articles created by Polbot
Plants described in 1845